Saint Pius X High School was a private, Roman Catholic high school at 844 North Keim Street in Lower Pottsgrove Township, Pennsylvania, United States, northeast of Pottstown. It was located in the Roman Catholic Archdiocese of Philadelphia.

Background
Saint Pius X High School was established in 1953, moving into the permanent building in 1955.
The mascot was a winged lion, the symbol of St. Mark. The Middlestates Association of Colleges and Schools accredited St. Pius X and students attended the school from 10 Catholic grade schools and 19 Catholic parishes along with 10 public school districts.

The school had a capacity of 400, but by 1966 the anticipated number of students was 670, too many students for its designed capacity and about three times its initial enrollment.

In 2008, the archdiocese announced that it will move St. Pius to a new location. On January 28, 2008, the archdiocese announced that a new high school in Upper Providence Township in Montgomery County will replace St. Pius X and Kennedy-Kenrick Catholic High School in Norristown.  The new Pope John Paul II High School opened in September 2010.  The old building housed Ringing Rocks Elementary School students while their school underwent renovations that were completed in 2012. The old building of St. Pius X High School currently remains unoccupied.

References

External links
  no longer valid

Defunct Catholic secondary schools in Pennsylvania
Educational institutions established in 1953
Schools in Montgomery County, Pennsylvania
1953 establishments in Pennsylvania
Educational institutions disestablished in 2010
Defunct schools in Pennsylvania